Wardwell may refer to:

People
 Allen Wardwell (1873–1953), American attorney
 Davis Polk & Wardwell
 Daniel Wardwell (1791–1878), American politician
 Samuel Wardwell (1643-1692), a man accused of witchcraft during the Salem witch trials
 Walter C. Wardwell (1859–1940), American politician

Places
 Camp Wardwell, or Fort Wardwell, later Fort Morgan (Colorado), U.S.

See also

 Wardwell-Trickey Double House, in Bangor, Maine, U.S.